Maridi Airport is an airport serving Maridi in South Sudan.

Location
Maridi Airport  is located in Maridi East County in Maridi State, in the town of Maridi, near the International border with the Democratic Republic of the Congo. The geographic coordinates of this airport are: 4° 54' 0.00" N, 29° 26' 24.00"E (Latitude: 4.9000; Longitude: 29.4400).

Overview
Maridi Airport is a small civilian airport that serves the town of Maridi and surrounding communities. A flood in 1993 destroyed the easternmost portion of the runway.  A packed dirt strip was hastily built; however, a permanent fix has not been created yet.

See also
 List of airports in South Sudan

References

External links
Location of Maridi Airport At Google Maps

Airports in South Sudan
Western Equatoria
Equatoria